SS James A. Wetmore was a Liberty ship built in the United States during World War II. She was named after James A. Wetmore, the Acting Supervising Architect of the United States, from 1915–1933.

Construction
James A. Wetmore was laid down on 14 August 1943, under a Maritime Commission (MARCOM) contract, MC hull 1502, by J.A. Jones Construction, Brunswick, Georgia, and launched on 30 October 1943.

History
She was allocated to William J. Rountree Company, on 11 November 1943. On 29 May 1948, she was laid up in the National Defense Reserve Fleet in Wilmington, North Carolina. On 19 January 1967, she was sold to Northern Metal Company, for $46,000, for scrapping. She was delivered on 18 February 1967.

References

Bibliography

 
 
 
 
 

 

Liberty ships
Ships built in Brunswick, Georgia
1943 ships
Wilmington Reserve Fleet